Creak(s) or creaking may refer to:

 Vocal fry register, a type of human voice register
 Neck creaking
 Mount Creak, a peak in Antarctica
 Mildred Creak (1898–1993), English psychiatrist
 Creaks, 2020 video game

See also 

 Crackle (disambiguation)
 Creek (disambiguation)